Fatal error may refer to

 Fatal exception error, an unrecoverable error that forces a process to terminate abnormally and return control to the operating system
 Fatal system error, an unrecoverable error of the operating system that requires a restart
 Fatal Error, a 1999 film about a computer virus that evolves into a biological virus
 Fatal System Error (book), an nonfiction account of a cybercrime investigation